The men's javelin throw at the 1934 European Athletics Championships was held in Turin, Italy, at the  Stadio Benito Mussolini on 7 September 1934.

Medalists

Results

Final
7 September

Participation

 (1)
 (2)
 (1)
 (1)
 (2)
 (1)

References

Javelin throw
Javelin throw at the European Athletics Championships